Château de Brézé is a small, dry-moated castle located in Brézé, near Saumur in the Loire Valley, France.

The château was transformed during the 16th and the 19th centuries. The current structure is Renaissance in style yet retains medieval elements including a drawbridge and a 12th-century troglodytic basement. 

Probably constructed as a refuge and shelter from Viking raids, the castle's cellars contain  of galleries ( of which is currently accessible) that include living spaces, storage areas and livestock areas.  

The château is a listed ancient monument originally dating from 1060. Today, it is the residence of descendants of the ancient lords.  

A range of wines are produced at the château which has  of vineyards.

See also
Brézé
Château
Saumur
Anjou
Loire Valley
France

References

External links
Château de Brézé official website
Photos of Château de Brézé and other Loire castles

Châteaux of the Loire Valley
Monuments historiques of Indre-et-Loire
Châteaux in Maine-et-Loire